The Verman is a river in Murmansk Oblast, Russia. For much of the Arctic Campaign of World War II stretches of it formed the front line, and much fighting occurred there.

Course and description
The river is located in the southwestern part of Murmansk Oblast. It is called the Lower, Middle, and Upper Verman respectively in its lower, middle and upper reaches. From there the river flows eastward and then, skirting Pogranichnuju Hill, it turns south and empties into the southwestern part of Lake Tolvand.

The highest hills on the Lower Verman are Vojta, Kruglaja, Pogranichnaja, Vojanvara, and Repotunturi.

There are heavy rapids in places. Immediately before the mouth is a  waterfall. There are several small unnamed islands in the river, and several relatively small tributaries, not shown on most maps.

Settlements and transportation
There are a few small settlements on the river. In several places there are rail lines and roads, including some all–weather roads. The Murman Railway crosses the Verman just above the mouth. A small  8–ton capacity bridge is located at the mouth of the river, and just north of there the Alakurtti–Kandalaksha highway crosses the river. At this point there is also a  40–ton capacity wooden bridge. Several all–weather roads cross the river upstream, at fords. On the slopes of Pogranichnaja there is a ruined bridge.

The river in World War II

In the northernmost sector of the Continuation War, the part of the river in the area around Kandalaksha defined the front line from September 17, 1941 until September 1944. On both banks of the river there are numerous ruins of military installations, fortifications, trenches, and fences left over from this war.

On the left bank of the river near the highway bridge is a monument in the form of a black obelisk. The obelisk bears the inscription "Soviet soldiers – victors of the Verman Front" and displays the names of the dead and maps of military operations. A little east of the river on the road to Kandalaksha there is a mass grave.

Gallery
Remains of World War II bunkers on the Verman River line

External links
Topographic map

References

 
 

Rivers of Murmansk Oblast